Fairview Park Fair Grounds was a baseball field located in Dover, Delaware. It was also known as Dover Grounds. It was used by the Philadelphia Athletics for one game on June 24, 1875. Philadelphia defeated the New Haven Elm Citys in that game 12–1.

References

External links
1875 Philadelphia Athletics

Buildings and structures in Dover, Delaware
Defunct baseball venues in the United States
Baseball venues in Delaware
Defunct sports venues in Delaware